Bengal studies (Bangabidya) is an interdisciplinary academic field devoted to the study of the Bengali people, culture, language, literature, and history. The focus of this field, which qualifies as area studies and cultural studies, is on Indic Bengalis who follow an indigenous system of faith and refer to themselves as Bengalis. It is a subset of South Asian studies or Indology.

A study of the history and culture of the Bengali people have been undertaken by the Bengalis themselves and others like Muhammadal-Biruni travelling to Bengal since medieval times. The work of Bankim Chandra Chattopadhyay is often considered to be a forerunner of Bengali studies after the Mughal period, while Ishwar Chandra Gupta pioneered the study of Bengali poets through a critically annotated collection of the diverse oral poetic traditions of Bengal. Twentieth-century Bengali historians like Ramesh Chandra Majumdar and Niharranjan Ray were among the prominent researchers of the history and culture of the Bengali people.

International Congress of Bengal Studies
 2010: 1st International Congress; University of Delhi, India
 2011: 2nd International Congress; University of Dhaka, Bangladesh
 2013: 3rd International Congress; University of Calcutta, India
 2015: 4th International Congress; Tokyo University of Foreign Studies, Japan
 2018: 5th International Congress; Jahangirnagar University, Bangladesh

References 

Studies
Bengali language
Bengali culture
Asian studies
Area studies
Indology